John Fernström (6 December 1897 – 19 October 1961) was a Swedish composer.

Fernström was born in Yichang, China, where he also spent most part of the first ten years of his life at the mission his father directed, except for a couple of years in Sweden. He resided permanently in the Swedish province of Skåne from 1907 and started to study the violin at the conservatory in Malmö. He was with the symphony orchestra of Helsingborg from 1916 until 1932, with some interruptions for studies; first as a violinist, later as one of its leading conductors. From 1941 he conducted the Lund Women's Student Choir at Lund University and took part in restructuring it, in 1948, into a mixed ensemble named Lund Academic Choir (Lunds akademiska kör). Later the same year Fernström left the choir when he was appointed director of the municipal music school in the city of Lund. In 1951 he founded the Nordic Youth Orchestra, which still today is an almost compulsory step for all young Scandinavian musicians on their way to become professional musicians. In 1953 he was elected member of the Royal Swedish Academy of Music. Fernström died in Lund.  He had written twelve symphonies, eight string quartets, many other chamber music pieces, concertos (among which two violin concertos, a bassoon concerto and a clarinet concerto), two operas, and a large number of songs and choral pieces.

External links
 Home page for John Fernström

1897 births
1961 deaths
20th-century classical composers
20th-century Swedish male musicians
20th-century Swedish musicians
Musicians from Skåne County
People from Yichang
Swedish classical composers
Swedish male classical composers
Swedish conductors (music)
Swedish expatriates in China